Andrée Lajoie (born October 23, 1933) is a Canadian jurist and academic living in Quebec.

She was born in Montreal and began working as a journalist for Vie étudiante when she was 15. Lajoie received a bachelor's degree in law from the Université de Montréal and then studied political science at the University of Oxford while working as a correspondent for Radio Canada in London. In 1961, she moved to New York City with her husband, a diplomat at the United Nations.

She is a member of the Bar of Quebec and of the Royal Society of Canada. She has also been a visiting professor at the universities of Paris, Padua, Trieste, Athens, Toronto, Victoria, Louvain and Brussels.

She has served on the advisory council for the Law Commission of Canada and for the Séguin commission on fiscal imbalance in Canada. She also contributed to various commissions including the Castonguay and Rochon commissions on health and social services, the Macdonald Commission and the Royal Commission on Aboriginal Peoples.

In 2003, she was awarded the Prix Léon-Gérin. She also received the  awarded by the Canadian Bar Association and the  awarded by the Association francophone pour le savoir.

Selected publications
 Le pouvoir déclaratoire du Parlement; augmentation discrétionnaire de la compétence fédérale au Canada by Andrée Lajoie, 1969
 Expropriation et fédéralisme au Canada by Andrée Lajoie, 1972

References 

1933 births
Living people
Lawyers in Quebec
Université de Montréal alumni
Academic staff of the Université de Montréal
Fellows of the Royal Society of Canada